Abou Sanogo (born 20 December 1994) is an Ivorian cyclist.

Major results
Source: 

2015
 National Road Championships
1st Road race
1st Under-23 road race
2016
 1st Stage 7 Tour de Côte d'Ivoire
 2nd Road race, National Road Championships
 2nd Overall Tour du Bénin
2017
 5th Overall Tour du Faso
1st Stages 1 & 9
2018
 8th Overall Tour de Côte d'Ivoire
1st Stage 6
 9th Overall Tour du Faso
2022
 3rd Road race, National Road Championships
 3rd Overall Tour de Côte d'Ivoire
1st Stage 7

References

External links

1994 births
Living people
Ivorian male cyclists